Arno Strohmeyer (born 26 July 1963) is an Austrian fencer. He competed in the individual épée events at the 1984 and 1988 Summer Olympics.

References

External links
 

1963 births
Living people
Austrian male fencers
Austrian épée fencers
Olympic fencers of Austria
Fencers at the 1984 Summer Olympics
Fencers at the 1988 Summer Olympics